Kolaghat can refer to:
 Kolaghat, a census town in the state of West Bengal, India.
 Kolaghat (community development block), a rural area administratively earmarked for planning and development, containing the Kolaghat census town.
 Kolaghat railway station
 Kolaghat Government Polytechnic
 Kolaghat Thermal Power Station